Saddam Hi Tenang, sometimes written as Saddam Tenang (born 2 February 1994, in Ternate), is an Indonesian professional footballer who plays as a full-back for Liga 1 club RANS Nusantara. Previously, he played for several Indonesian first-tier league clubs.

Club career

Youth
He began his youth football career at Aceh United, before joining Persebaya in 2011, also for the youth team.

Arema Indonesia
In February 2012, he was loaned out to Arema Indonesia (later Arema F.C.) and established himself as regular during 2011-12 Indonesian Premier League, and played in several big matches, such as when Arema Indonesia played Bontang F.C. and Malang Derby versus Persema Malang. During a Piala Indonesia game, when Arema played PSM Makasar, he received a red card.

Pelita Bandung Raya
In 2014, he signed for Pelita Bandung Raya (later the club changed its name to Madura United) to play in Indonesian Super League. He helped Pelita Bandung Raya reach the semifinal of 2014 Indonesia Super League. However, in the next season, he had a hard time, due to his injury and high competition.

Persijap Jepara
He moved to Persijap Jepara in 2017 and played his first game in the second half of the season after his injury recovery.

Persiraja Banda Aceh
In 2018, he signed for Persiraja Banda Aceh to play in Liga 2.

Muba Babel United
In 2019, Saddam signed a one-year contract with Indonesian Liga 2 club Muba Babel United.

Honours

Club
RANS Cilegon
 Liga 2 runner-up: 2021

References

External links
 

1994 births
Indonesian footballers
People from Ternate
Sportspeople from North Maluku
Liga 1 (Indonesia) players
Liga 2 (Indonesia) players
Persebaya Surabaya players
Arema F.C. players
Pelita Bandung Raya players
Persijap Jepara players
Persiraja Banda Aceh players
BaBel United F.C. players
RANS Nusantara F.C. players
PS Barito Putera players
Association football defenders
Living people